Polynucleobacter hirudinilacicola is an aerobic, chemo-organotrophic, non-motile, free-living bacterium of the genus Polynucleobacter.

The type strain was isolated from a small alkaline lake located in Austria. The genome sequence of the strain was fully determined. The type strain dwells as a free-living, planktonic bacterium in the water column of the lake, thus is part of freshwater bacterioplankton. Among the described Polynucleobacter species, P. hirudinilacicola is closest related to P. campilacus.

References 

Burkholderiaceae
Bacteria described in 2018